The 2015 Valencia City Council election, also the 2015 Valencia municipal election, was held on Sunday, 24 May 2015, to elect the 10th City Council of the municipality of  Valencia. All 33 seats in the City Council were up for election. The election was held simultaneously with regional elections in thirteen autonomous communities and local elections all throughout Spain.

The unveiling of a string of corruption scandals during the 2011–2015 period involving the party in power, coupled with allegations of abuse of power and perceived poor management of the economic situation, had taken its toll in the ruling People's Party (PP), which went on to suffer a dramatic decline, losing over half of its vote share and city councillors and scoring its worst result since 1991. The scope of the PP collapse was such that incumbent mayor Rita Barberá was quoted saying "¡Qué hostia!" amid tears (Spanish for "What a smack!") after learning of the results in election night. As a result, the election turned into a surprisingly close race with the Valencianist coalition Compromís, which scored a strong second place. The Socialist Party of the Valencian Country (PSPV–PSOE), unable to capitalize on the PP losses, continued its long-term decline and fell to fourth place, with its votes being drawn away to both Compromís and newly created Podemos-led Valencia in Common coalition. Centrist Citizens (C's), contesting a Valencian municipal election for the first time, turned into the third political force through its capture of disenchanted PP voters, while historical United Left of the Valencian Country (EUPV), standing within the Acord Ciutadà coalition (Valencian for "Citizen Agreement"), failed to achieve enough votes to win seats on the local assembly.

As a result of the election, with the PP unable to command a majority of seats in the city council even with the support of C's, Barberá was ousted from office after 24 years of government, being succeeded by Compromís candidate Joan Ribó. The 2015 election marked the end of the two decade-long PP political dominance over both the city and the whole of the Valencian Community, losing control over the regional government, all provincial capitals and most major cities in the region to left-wing coalitions and alliances.

Electoral system
The City Council of Valencia was the top-tier administrative and governing body of the municipality of Valencia, composed of the mayor, the government council and the elected plenary assembly. Elections to the local councils in Spain were fixed for the fourth Sunday of May every four years.

Voting for the local assembly was on the basis of universal suffrage, which comprised all nationals over 18 years of age, registered and residing in the municipality of Valencia and in full enjoyment of their political rights, as well as resident non-national European citizens and those whose country of origin allowed Spanish nationals to vote in their own elections by virtue of a treaty. Local councillors were elected using the D'Hondt method and a closed list proportional representation, with an electoral threshold of five percent of valid votes—which included blank ballots—being applied in each local council. Councillors were allocated to municipal councils based on the following scale:

The mayor was indirectly elected by the plenary assembly. A legal clause required that mayoral candidates earned the vote of an absolute majority of councillors, or else the candidate of the most-voted party in the assembly was to be automatically appointed to the post. In the event of a tie, the appointee would be determined by lot.

Background
Rita Barberá of the People's Party (PP) was elected to a sixth term as mayor of Valencia after her party won a fifth consecutive absolute majority in the local assembly in the 2011 election. The then-ruling party of Spain, the Spanish Socialist Workers' Party (PSOE), had suffered a serious decline in popular support following Prime Minister José Luis Rodríguez Zapatero's approval of unpopular austerity measures to try to tackle the economic crisis that was beleaguering the country. The PP benefitted from the PSOE's collapse, which helped cement its landslide victory by an absolute majority of seats in the 2011 general election held on 20 November and paving the way for the investiture of Mariano Rajoy as new prime minister.

However, the PP in the city of Valencia had already shown signs of political wear in the 2011 election—suffering a slight decrease in support—as a result of Barberá's continuous tenure as city mayor since 1991, as well as the unveiling of the Gürtel corruption scandal in 2009. The scandal would result in regional president Francisco Camps's resignation in July 2011, just one month after taking office, with Alberto Fabra succeeding him as regional premier. The following years saw the unveiling of a series of corruption scandals affecting the PP, involving party deputies, mayors, local councillors, two Corts's speakers and former regional president José Luis Olivas. The regional party leadership also had to cope with accusations of illegal financing, as well as possible embezzlement offences in the additional costs incurred in the Formula 1 project and Pope Benedict XVI's 2006 visit to Valencia, accusations that also reached Barberá's local government.

At the same time, both the regional and local governments had to deal with the effects of an ongoing financial crisis. The regional executive was forced to ask for a bailout from the central government headed by Rajoy in July 2012, with its economic situation remaining severe because of high unemployment and debt. The decision of Fabra's government to close down RTVV, the regional public television broadcasting channel, because of financing issues, was also met with widespread protests.

The 2014 European Parliament election, which resulted in enormous losses for the PP in the entire Valencian Community, paved the way for the rise of new parties Podemos, Compromís and Citizens, with the PSOE local branch finding itself unable to gain anything from the PP's lost support. As a result, the ruling PP faced the 2015 election with a severe decline in popular support, an increase of electoral competitiveness and the shadow of corruption looming over the local PP leadership.

Parties and candidates
The electoral law allowed for parties and federations registered in the interior ministry, coalitions and groupings of electors to present lists of candidates. Parties and federations intending to form a coalition ahead of an election were required to inform the relevant Electoral Commission within ten days of the election call, whereas groupings of electors needed to secure the signature of a determined amount of the electors registered in the municipality for which they were seeking election, disallowing electors from signing for more than one list of candidates. For the case of Valencia, as its population was between 300,001 and 1,000,000, at least 5,000 signatures were required.

Below is a list of the main parties and electoral alliances which contested the election:

Campaign

Party slogans

Issues
In April 2015, Compromís denounced mayor Rita Barberá's expenses charged to public funds during 2011 and 2014, believing they could constitute an embezzlement offence as they were not related to municipal functions but to party and personal actions. The leaked bills, a total of 466 throughout the legislature amounting to expenditures of 278,000 euros, included payments for air travel, train tickets, car trips, hotels and restaurants. Compromís candidate Joan Ribó commented that "at a time when there are 85,000 unemployed in Valencia and it is the city with the highest number of evictions per capita, it is obscene, unsupportive and unethical to find all of these luxury expenses".

During the election campaign, the public prosecutor announced that it would open an investigation into Barberá's expenses, which would be linked to the already ongoing investigations on her because of luxury gifts worth 7,600 euros she would have allegedly received between 2007 and 2009 from a public body chaired by herself. The unveiling of such practices was dubbed as the "Ritaleaks case" by opposition parties—in reference to Rita Barberá's name—, which believed that such expenses were part of a larger scheme that maintained an illegal funding of the Valencian PP through public funds. The expenses scandal dominated the political landscape during the campaign, with Barberá herself being frequently booed during outdoor political acts in markets. She responded by saying she was being the target of a defamation campaign orchestrated by Compromís, and denied committing any wrongdoing or misuse of public money.

Another related scandal, the "Imelsa case", shook the PP campaign as EUPV leaked recordings allegedly belonging to public entity Imelsa former director, Marcos Benavent. Such recordings involved senior party officials, such as Xàtiva Mayor and President of the Valencia Deputation Alfonso Rus, in an alleged illegal financing network of the Valencian PP. The PP denounced Rus and expelled him from the party just 20 days ahead of the election, but he refused to withdraw as candidate and continued campaigning as an independent; the PP being unable to contest the local election in Xàtiva in a separate list.

Opinion polls
The table below lists voting intention estimates in reverse chronological order, showing the most recent first and using the dates when the survey fieldwork was done, as opposed to the date of publication. Where the fieldwork dates are unknown, the date of publication is given instead. The highest percentage figure in each polling survey is displayed with its background shaded in the leading party's colour. If a tie ensues, this is applied to the figures with the highest percentages. The "Lead" column on the right shows the percentage-point difference between the parties with the highest percentages in a poll. When available, seat projections determined by the polling organisations are displayed below (or in place of) the percentages in a smaller font; 17 seats were required for an absolute majority in the City Council of Valencia.

Results

Aftermath

Consequences
As election results were known, mayor Rita Barberá conceded defeat to Joan Ribó from Compromís, whose surprise results—9 city councillors and 23.3% of the vote—allowed him to be appointed as new Mayor through an alliance with both the PSPV–PSOE and VALC, as all three commanded an absolute majority of seats together. The PP had hoped to rely on support from newcomer C's, but its 6 seats, together with the PP's 10, meant that they fell one seat short of an overall majority. Compromís's historic result came mostly at the cost of a declining PSOE, which fell to fourth place and obtained its worst result in history. In her concession speech, Barberá stated that "I come with dignity, pride and gratitude to all Valencians that have allowed me to be mayor for 24 years", commenting on her party's result—which lost over half of its 2011 vote and city councillors—that "it is a bad result, I will not hide from it". The shock from the PP collapse was such that, in a spontaneous reaction after learning of the results in election night, a tearful Barberá was recorded by cameras as saying "¡Qué hostia!...¡Qué hostia!" (Spanish for "What a smack!... what a smack!") while embracing a party colleague.

As a result of the three left-from-centre parties reaching an agreement to take power over the city, Joan Ribó was appointed as new mayor of Valencia on 13 June 2015 thanks to the votes of Compromís, the PSPV and VALC. Barberá, who had renounced her seat in the city council the previous day, did not attend Ribó's appointment. The new PP local leader, Alfonso Novo, congratulated Ribó on his election and said the PP would maintain "institutional loyalty, but also firmness and exemplariness" in the new party's role as "opposition and control".

Just seven months later, on 26 January 2016, a major police operation in Valencia would result in the arrest of several high-ranking members from the Valencian PP regional and local branches, as a consequence of the ongoing investigation on the PP's corruption in the region during its time in government. Several days later, on 1 February, all ten PP city councillors in the city council of Valencia, including Novo himself, would be charged for a money laundering offence, related to the party's illegal financing in the Valencian Community. Judicial investigation pointed to former Mayor Rita Barberá also being involved in the scandal—that also covered the possible illegal funding of her 2015 election run—with her arrest or imputation only being prevented by the fact she had legal protection as an incumbent senator.

Investiture vote

Notes

References
Opinion poll sources

Other

Valencia
Elections in Valencia